Three vessels of the Royal Navy have been named HMS Lynn after King's Lynn:
  was a 32-gun Lyme group frigate launched in 1696 and sold in 1713.
  was a 42-gun 1706 Establishment frigate launched in 1715 and broken up in 1732.
  was a 44-gun 1733 Establishment frigate launched in 1741 and sold in 1763.

References
 

Royal Navy ship names